Irvin J. Holdash (September 19, 1929 – December 18, 1992), sometimes known by the nickname "Huck", was an American football player.  He grew up in Austintown, Ohio, and played college football for the North Carolina Tar Heels football team at the center and linebacker position from 1948 to 1950.  He was selected by the All-America Board as a first-team center and by the Associated Press as a first-team linebacker on the 1950 College Football All-America Team. He was selected by the Cleveland Browns with the 82nd pick in the 1951 NFL Draft, but he was induced into the United States Army where he served for two years.  He later worked for many years for Norton Company as a packaging engineer.

References

External links
 

1929 births
1992 deaths
American football centers
American football linebackers
North Carolina Tar Heels football players
People from Austintown, Ohio
Players of American football from Ohio
United States Army soldiers